Grand Ma[i]gne ("Great Maina", in ) or Vieux Ma[i]gne ("Old Maina", in ) was a Frankish castle in the Mani Peninsula, Greece. It was built, according to the Chronicle of the Morea, ca. 1248–1250 AD by William II Villehardouin, the Prince of Achaea in order to control the Slavic tribe of the Melingoi, living on Mount Taygetos. He was captured by the Byzantines in 1259 at the Battle of Pelagonia, and had to give up the castle as part of his ransom.

The location of the castle is not clear. Modern usage refers to the castle of Porto Kagio as "Mani", but medieval portolans place the castle of Grand Magne on the western shore of the peninsula and its fortification was not mentioned by portolans or travelers before about 1568. Another candidate is the settlement of Tigani, but although a sizeable medieval town it shows no traces of having been the site of a Crusader fortress. Antoine Bon preferred the nearby site of Cavo Grosso (Cape Thyrides), known as Kastro tis Orias, where 19th-century travellers, including the French Expédition scientifique de Morée, mentioned the existence of fortifications, and which occupies a commanding position. J. M. Wagstaff rejected this as, according to his research, there is no evidence that there ever was a fortification at Kastro tis Orias, and preferred to identify Grand Magne with the castle at Kelefa. He admits that the evidence is weak, for the design of Kelefa Castle is not typical of Frankish forts, but points out that there is evidence that the Ottomans rebuilt it in 1670.

References

External links
Where is the Castle of Grande Magne?
Reconnaissance of the Mysterious Tigani Peninsula (In German)

Castles and fortifications of the Principality of Achaea
Mani Peninsula
Medieval Laconia
Articles with unknown geocoordinates